Lương Tích Thiện (born 24 January 1976) is a Vietnamese sprinter. He competed in the men's 100 metres at the 2000 Summer Olympics.

References

External links
 

1976 births
Living people
Athletes (track and field) at the 2000 Summer Olympics
Vietnamese male sprinters
Olympic athletes of Vietnam
Place of birth missing (living people)
Athletes (track and field) at the 1998 Asian Games
Asian Games competitors for Vietnam
20th-century Vietnamese people
21st-century Vietnamese people